Rodrigue Massianga (born 2 May 1991) is a French Paralympic athlete who competes in the 400 metres at international elite competitions. He is a European champion in this event.

References

External links
 
 

1991 births
Living people
Athletes from Paris
Paralympic athletes of France
French male sprinters
Athletes (track and field) at the 2016 Summer Paralympics
Medalists at the World Para Athletics European Championships
20th-century French people
21st-century French people